Monarch Books was an American publishing firm in the late 1950s/early 1960s which specialised in pulp novels. Some of these, like Jack the Ripper (1960), were movie tie-ins.

Published novels
 101 - Dark Hunger by Don James (1958)
 102 - Winter Range by Alan Leman (1958) (Ⓒ 1932)
 105 - Shadow of the Mafia by Louis Malley (1958)
 107 - Wild to Possess by Gil Brewer (1959)
 115 - Madigan's women by John Conway (1959) 
 123 - Beyond our Pleasure by James Kendricks (1959)
 125 - Nikki by Stuart Friedman (1960)
 131 - The Darkness of Love by Harry Olive (1960) 
 133 - The Flesh Peddlers by Frank Boyd (1960)
 134 - Fury in the Heart by W. T. Ballard (1959)
 136 - Not For A Curse by Karl Kramer (1959)
 137 - Jailbait Street by Hal Ellson (1960)
 140 - The Glory Jumpers by Delano Stagg (1960)
 143 - Jack the Ripper by Stuart James (1960) – tie-in with the 1959 film of the same name
 146 - A Girl Named Tamiko by Ronald Kirkbride (1960)
 147 - Like Ice She Was by William Ard (1960)
 149 - The Flesh and the Flame by Robert Carse (1960)
 152 - The Sins of Billy Serene by William Ard (1960)
 153 - Frisco Flat by Stuart James (1960)
 173 - The Satyr  by James McKimmey, Jr (1960)
 184 - The Lovers of Pompeii by Theodore Pratt (1960)
 187 - Appointment in Hell by Gil Brewer
 196 - Lament for Julie  by Robert Colby (1961)
 199 - Brother and sister by Edwin West pseud. Donald Westlake (1961)
 201 - The Fly Girls by Stuart Friedman (1960)
 202 - Debbie by Paul Daniels (1960)
 206 - By Passion Obsessed by V.J. Coberly (1961)
 207 - The Strange Ways of Love by Clayton Matthews (1961)
 212 - Beyond All Desire by Tom Phillips (1961)
 221 - My father's wife by Jay Carr, pseud. James P Duff (1961)
 241 - Rasputin: the Mad Monk by Stuart Friedman (1959) – tie-in with the film of the same name
 252 - The Space Egg by Russ Winterbotham (1962)
 253 - The Promiscuous Doll by Clayton Matthews (1962)
 258 - Hollywood Starlet by Don James (1962) 
 262 - Tropic of Cleo by Rick Holmes (1962)
 267 - More about Marmaduke by Brad Anderson, Phil Leeming (1962)
 269 - Give Me This Woman by William Ard (1962)
 275 - Save her for Loving by William Johnston (1962)
 293 - Women of evil  by Wenzell Brown (1963)
 299 - Ruby by Paul Daniels (1963)
 300 - King of the Harem Heaven by Anthony Sterling (1960)
 304 - The Wicked, Wicked Women by James Kendricks
 331 - Nude Running by Clayton Matthews (1963)
 333 - The Texas Rangers by John Conway
 343 - Dark Hunger by Don James (1963)
 361 - By Her Own hand by Frank Bonham (1963)
 362 - Rest in Agony by Ivar Jorgensen (1963)
 364 - Wild to Possess, 2nd Printing by Gil Brewer
 377 - Nikki Revisited by Stuart Friedman (1963)
 385 - My Neighbor's Wife by Sam Webster (1963)
 387 - Company Girl by Nicholas Gorham (1963)
 389 - Occasion of Sin by Robert William Taylor (1963)
 394 - Pattern for Destruction by Paul Daniels 
 395 - The Violent Lady by Michael E. Knerr (1963)
 397 - 21 Sunset Drive by Henry Ellsworth (1964)
 403 - Sherry by Wenzell Brown (1964)
 405 - The Jet Set by Mack Reynolds (1964)
 412 - November Reef by Robert Maugham (1964)
 413 - End of a Diplomat by Ronald Simpson (1964)
 416 - In Savage Surrender by Whitman Chambers (1964)
 420 - Louisa by Eric Allen (1964)
 422 - Jealous by Paul Daniels 
 431 - Planet Big Zero by Franklin Hadley (1960)
 444 - Play it Hard by Gil Brewer (1969)
 445 - The Way we Love by Stuart Friedman (1964)
 454 - New Doctor at Tower General by John J. Miller (1964)
 465 - Hard Man from Texas by John Conway/Jack Thurston (1964) 
 468 Eve's Apple by Ronald Simpson (1961) 
 483 - The Girl from Big Pine by Talmage Powell (1964)
 486 - The Damned and the Innocent by Glenn Canary (1964)
 488 - Lament for Judy by Robert Colby (1964)
 498 - She'll Get Hers by John Plunkett (1965)
 524 - Unwed Mothers by Henry S. Galus (1962)
 560 - The Man from Gunsight by William Chamberlain (1965) 
 MM601 - The Stranglers of Bombay by Stuart James (1960) – tie-in with the 1959 film of the same name
 MM602 - The Brides of Dracula by Dean Owen (1960) – tie-in with the 1960 film of the same name
 MM603 - Gorgo by Carson Bingham (1960) – tie-in with the film of the same name
 MM604 - Konga by Dean Owen (1960) – tie-in with the film of the same name
 MM605 - Reptilicus by Dean Owen (1961) – tie-in with the 1961 film of the same name
 MM606 - The Street is My Beat by Carson Bingham (1961) – tie-in with the film of the same name
 MM607 - Mad Dog Coll by Steve Thurman (1961) – tie-in with the 1961 film of the same name
 MS1 - Fidel Castro Assassinated by Lee Duncan (1961)

Published Nonfiction

 435 - For every young heart: America's most popular singing idol talks to teenagers about growing up by Connie Francis
 479 - Encyclopedia of the World's Great Events: 1964 (1965)
 494 - Undertow by Helen Parkhurst (1965)
  K66 - Robert F. Kennedy, Assistant President by Gary Gordon, pseud. (1962)
  MA328 - Admiral "Bull" Halsey by Jack Pearl (1962) 
  MA333 - The Texas Rangers by John Conway (1963) 
 MB512 - Folk and Modern Medicine by Don James (1961)
 MB524 - Unwed Mothers by Henry S. Galus (1962)
 MB528 - Medical problems of women by Martin James (1962)
 MB530 - Virgin Wives by L T Woodward (1962)
 MB535 -The Sexually Promiscuous Female by Benjamin Morse, pseud. (1963)
 MB537 - The Sexually Promiscuous Male by Benjamin Morse, pseud. (1963)
 ML20 - Monarch Italian Phonetic Dictionary by Joseph Castelli (1961)
 MM543 - The Lesbian by Benjamin Morse (1961)
 MS2 - The Berlin Crisis by Deane & David Heller (1961)
 MS4 - The Rise and Fall of the Japanese Empire by Gary Gordon (pseud of I.G. Edmonds) (1962)
 MS5 - Planned Parenthood by Henry De Forrest (1962) 
 MS6 - The Naked Rise of Communism by Frank L Kluckhorn 
 MS7 - Forget about Calories by Leland H O'Brian (1962)
 MS8 - The Cold War by Deane and David Heller (1962)
 MS9 - A Gallery of the Saints by Randall Garrett (1963)
 MS10 - The History of Surgery by L.T. Woodward, pseud. (1963)
 MS11 - The Red Carpet by Ezra Taft Benson (1963)
 MS12 - The Kennedy Recession by Merryle Stanley Rukeyser (1963)
 MS13 - How to Stay Young and Beautiful by Jan Michael (1963)
 MS53 - America: Listen! by Frank L. Kluckhohn (1961)
 MS53A - America: Listen! by Frank L. Kluckhorn (1962) (New revised & enlarged)
 MS53B - America: Listen! by Frank L Kluckhorn (1963) (New enlarged edition)
 SB522 - The Attacks on our Free Choice by Merryle Stanley Rukeyser (1963)
 SP1 - First American in Space by Robert Silverberg (1961)

References

Defunct book publishing companies of the United States
Book publishing companies based in Connecticut